Janetta may refer to:

Janetta Rebold Benton, American art historian
Janetta Douglas, née Smith, MBE, Papua New Guinean charity worker
Janetta Gillespie (1876–1956), Scottish artist
Janetta Johnson (born 1964), African-American transgender rights activist
Janetta McStay CBE (1917–2012), New Zealand concert pianist and music professor
Lavinia Janetta Horton de Serres Ryves (1797–1871), British woman claiming to be a member of the British royal family
Ruth Janetta Temple (1892–1984), American physician in Los Angeles, California
Janetta Vance (1855–1921), British archer

See also
Bathyergus janetta or Namaqua dune mole-rat (Bathyergus janetta)
Euphaedra janetta, the Janetta Themis forester butterfly
Syntherata janetta, commonly known as the emperor moth
Tagiades janetta spread-winged skipper butterfly
Janet (disambiguation)
Janette (disambiguation)
Jannette
Jeanetta (disambiguation)
Jeanette (disambiguation)
Jennata